Wellman is a Croatian documentary film directed by Branko Ištvančić. It was released in 2003. The title is a play on superhero names like Superman and Batman. The film was screened on over 30 festivals worldwide and received several awards.

Synopsis
The film's protagonist, Antun "Nuno" Gabajček is a master of a dying trade: he excavates wells without using machines, relying only on hand tools. This approach is not just highly demanding physically, but also requires well-thought-out methods and resourcefulness.

References

External links
 
 Wellman on Branko Ištvančić's website

2003 films
Croatian short documentary films
2000s Croatian-language films
2003 short documentary films
Documentary films about water and the environment
Water wells